The Tatta (Taatta) is a river in the Sakha Republic (Yakutia), Russia, a left tributary of the Aldan, part of the Lena basin. 

There are many inhabited places close to the banks of the Tatta, especially in its upper and middle reaches, including Churapcha and Ytyk-Kyuyol towns, as well as Uolba, Bulun, Dyabyla, Kharbala 1st, Kharbala 2nd, Cherkyokh, Borobul and Tolon villages. 

Tatta District of the Sakha Republic was named after the river. The R504 Kolyma Highway crosses the Tatta roughly in the middle of its course.

Course
The Tatta originates in the eastern slopes of the Lena Plateau and is the 7th longest tributary of the Aldan. It flows roughly northwards across a wide, flat valley marked by permafrost and thermokarst zones. 

The source of the river and the first  of its course lie in the Amga District where the river flows in a northeastern direction, which continues further on across the entire Churapcha District. In its lower course the Tatta bends northwards east of Churapcha town and enters the Tatta District flowing slowly and meandering until its mouth.

The Tatta meets the left side of the Aldan very near the mouth of the Baray on the facing bank,  from its confluence with the Lena.

There are about 2,300 lakes in the Tatta basin. One of them Ytyk-Kyuyol, meaning "sacred lake" in the Yakut language, gives its name to Ytyk-Kyuyol, the seat of the Tatta District. Another important lake in the river basin is Churapcha Lake, a protected area. 

The Tatta basin has a harsh continental climate, with long, cold winters. The river freezes in October and stays frozen until the second half of May. 

Compared to other watercourses in Yakutia, the Tatta is not a mighty river. It has a rather feeble water discharge and in dry years the river may dry up in the summer. However, there are years in which it may cause disastrous floods.

See also
List of rivers of Russia
Central Yakutian Lowland

References

External links
Memory and Indigenous Identity in Sakha Republic (Yakutia)

Rivers of the Sakha Republic
Central Yakutian Lowland